The 7th annual Billboard Latin Music Awards, which honor the most popular albums, songs, and performers in Latin music, took place in Miami.

Pop Album of the Year, Male
Luis Miguel — Amarte Es Un Placer
 Marco Antonio Solís — Trozos de Mi Alma
 Cristian Castro — Mi Vida Sin Tu Amor
 Carlos Ponce — Todo lo que soy

Pop album of the year, group
"MTV Unplugged", Maná
"Amor, Familia y Respeto", A.B. Quintanilla y Los Kumbia Kings
"Mi Gloria Eres Tu", Los Tri-O 
"Un Poco Mas", MDO

Pop album of the year, female
"Noelia", Noelia
"Llegar A Ti", Jaci Velasquez
"Corazón", Ednita Nazario 
"Te Acordarás de Mí", Olga Tañón

Pop album of the year, new artist
"Amor, Familia y Respeto", A.B. Quintanilla y Los Kumbia Kings
"Llegar A Ti", Jaci Velasquez
"Comenzaré", Luis Fonsi
"Noelia", Noelia

Latin Pop Track of the Year
Ricky Martin — "Livin' la Vida Loca"
 Ricky Martin — "Bella"
 Enrique Iglesias — "Bailamos"
 Alejandro Fernandez — "Loco"

Tropical/salsa album of the year, male
"Píntame", Elvis Crespo
"Buena Vista Social Club Presents Ibrahim Ferrer", Ibrahim Ferrer
"Inconfundible", Víctor Manuelle
"El Amor de Mi Tierra", Carlos Vives

Tropical/salsa album of the year, female
"Sola", La India
"Olga Viva, Viva Olga", Olga Tañón
"Atada", Gisselle
"Con los Pies Sobre la Tierra", Melina León

Tropical/salsa album of the year, group
"Gotcha!", DLG
"Masters of the Stage: 2000 Veces Manía", Grupomania (Universal Latino)
"Para El Bailador", La Makina
"Séptima Harmonía", Limi-T 21

Tropical/salsa album of the year, new artist
"Buena Vista Social Club Presents Ibrahim Ferrer", Ibrahim Ferrer
"Caminando", Tony Tun Tun
"Sublime Ilusión", Eliades Ochoa
"Entrega", George Lamond

Tropical/salsa track of the year
"El Niágara en Bicicleta", Juan Luis Guerra
"No Me Ames", Jennifer Lopez and Marc Anthony
"Píntame", Elvis Crespo
"Pero Dile", Víctor Manuelle

Regional Mexican album of the year, male
"Mi Verdad", Alejandro Fernandez
"Por Una Mujer Bonita", Pepe Aguilar
"Por El Amor De Siempre", Pepe Aguilar
"Los Mas Grandes Exitos de los Dandy's", Victor Fernández

Regional Mexican album of the year, male group

"Nuestro Amor", Los Tri-O
"Alma", Conjunto Alma Norteña
"Contigo", Intocable
"Herencia De Familia", Los Tigres del Norte

Regional Mexican album of the year, female group or female solo artist
"Corazón de Cristal", Priscila y Sus Balas de Plata
"En Vivo--En Concierto", Grupo Límite
"Arrancame A Puños", Yesenia Flores
"Todo Por Tí", Priscila y Sus Balas de Plata

Regional Mexican album of the year, new artist
"Nuestro Amor", Los Tri-O
"Alma", Conjunto Alma Norteña
"La Magia Del Amor", Los Ángeles de Charly
"Donde Estás Corazón", Pablo Montero

Regional Mexican track of the year
"Lágrimas", Los Tigres del Norte
"El Peor de Mis Fracasos", Marco Antonio Solís
"Si Te Pudiera Mentir", Marco Antonio Solís
"Te Quiero Mucho", Los Rieleros del Norte

Latin rock/fusion album of the year
"Fundamental", Puya
"Bajo el Azul de Tu Misterio", Jaguares
"Resurrection", Chris Pérez Band
"Tres", Fiel a la Vega

Hot Latin Track of the Year
 "Loco", Alejandro Fernandez"
"No Me Ames", Jennifer Lopez and Marc Anthony
"Livin' la Vida Loca", "Ricky Martin"
"Si Te Pudiera Mentir", Marco Antonio Solís

Latin rap album of the year
"Los grandes éxitos en español", Cypress Hill
"Apocalypshit", Molotov
"El Padrino", Fulanito

Hot Latin Tracks of the Year, Vocal Duo
"No Me Ames", Jennifer Lopez and Marc Anthony
 "Santo Santo", Só Pra Contrariar and Gloria Estefan
 "Escondidos", Olga Tañón and Cristian Castro
 "La persona equivocada", Melina León and Víctor Manuelle

Latin Dance Maxi-Single of the Year
"Santo Santo", Só Pra Contrariar and Gloria Estefan
 "Ritmo Total", Enrique Iglesias
 "Bailando", Angelina
 "Que Te Vas", George Lamond

Contemporary Latin jazz album of the year
Los Hombres Calientes, Los Hombres Calientes
Inner Voyage, Gonzalo Rubalcaba
Latin Soul, Poncho Sanchez
Briyumba Palo Congo, Chucho Valdés

The Billboard Latin 50 Artist of the year
Elvis Crespo
Enrique Iglesias
Ricky Martin
Selena

Hot Latin Tracks Artist of the Year
Enrique Iglesias
Ricky Martin
Marco Antonio Solis
Christian Castro

Songwriter of the Year
Marco Antonio Solis
 Kike Santander
 Juan Gabriel
 Rudy Pérez

Producer of the Year
Pedro Ramírez
 Rudy Pérez
 Bebu Silvetti
 Kike Santander

Publisher of the year
Warner-Tamerlane
BMG Songs
Ventura

Publishing corporation of the year
Warner/Chappell Music
Universal Music
EMI Music

Billboard Lifetime achievement award
Jorge Pinos

Billboard Latin Music Hall of Fame
Marco Antonio Solís

References

Billboard Latin Music Awards
Latin Billboard Music Awards
Latin Billboard Music Awards
Billboard Music Awards
Latin Billboard Music